KSPI may refer to:
 KSP Interstellar a Mod for the computergame Kerbal Space Program
 The ICAO code for Abraham Lincoln Capital Airport
 KSPI (AM), a radio station (780 AM) located in Stillwater, Oklahoma, United States
 KSPI-FM, a radio station (93.7 FM) located in Stillwater, Oklahoma, United States